Children Incorporated is a non-profit 501(c)(3) international child sponsorship and child assistance organization based in North Chesterfield, Virginia. Children Incorporated was founded in 1964 by Jeanne Clarke Wood. Children Incorporated relies on individual sponsors and donors to provide opportunities to children all around the world.

As an international non-profit,  Children Incorporated partners with other organizations that are already structured to address areas of need for children – established orphanages, schools, and childcare centers that have the staff required.

Children Incorporated works in the United States and abroad. The U.S. programs include three primary divisions: inner city, which includes Chicago, Illinois; Detroit, Michigan; Washington, D.C.; New Orleans, Louisiana; and Richmond, Virginia; American Indian, primarily in the Navajo reservation in Arizona and New Mexico; and Appalachian, primarily in Kentucky and West Virginia.

Noted donors and recognition 

In 1997, Dr. Richard Carlson wrote about Children Incorporated in two of the books in his "Don’t Sweat the Small Stuff" series, in which he indicated that he and his wife and children were all donors, and tells of the positive experience of helping a child move forward in life. Carlson commented that, while many child sponsorship organizations are efficient and commendable, his personal favorite was Children Incorporated in Virginia. The two books, one of which was a New York Times Best Seller, resulted in over 11,000 individual child sponsorships through Children Incorporated.

One of Children Incorporated’s most noted donors was poker professional Barry Greenstein. Greenstein chose Children Incorporated as the primary recipient of his poker winnings. Mr. Greenstein realized that there were nearly 300 unpaid volunteer coordinators managing the Children Incorporated programs in locations around the world.  He wanted to do something to acknowledge these volunteers' valuable work with Children Incorporated, thus, in 2008, he donated $1,000.00 for each coordinator, to be used in the various centers as needed.  Some coordinators maintained a portion of the donations for their own use, but the vast majority of them put the money back into their programs for the benefit of the children they served.

In 2012, singer/songwriter Rosanne Cash headlined the Richmond Folk Festival to commemorate her 25 years of sponsorship with the organization and raise local awareness.

In 2014, Children Incorporated celebrated 50 years of helping children around the world. To date, the organization had helped over 300,000 children to receive an education. 

In 2015, Children Incorporated launched their On the Road Series, which takes readers around the world visiting the affiliated projects and meeting with sponsored children.

In 2017, Children Incorporated partnered with Kristine Carlson, the wife of the late Dr. Richard Carlson, to promote the organization around the 20th Anniversary of "Don't Sweat the Small Stuff."

In 2017, Mary Wilson of the group The Supremes became a sponsor with Children Incorporated.

In 2019, Children Incorporated celebrated 55 years as an organization.

In 2022, Children Incorporated launched the Stories of Hope Blog Series, bringing stories of the impact of donors contributions to readers on a weekly basis. https://childrenincorporated.org/stories-of-hope/

References 

Non-profit organizations based in Richmond, Virginia
Educational organizations based in Virginia
Organizations established in 1964